NRC School is located in Mohone, Kalyan. It was started in 1950. The school is affiliated to (SSC) Maharashtra Board. It is currently managed by Adani Group of schools.

School Socials and Websites

Facebook , JustDial , LinkedIn

Academic programs 
The School Has

 Pre-Primary
 Primary
 Secondary

Teaching Mediums 
 English 
 Marathi

School Details 
Below Table Contains Details Related To NRC School And Its Sections 

 English Pre-Primary
 English Primary
 English Secondary 
 Marathi Primary 
 Marathi Secondary

Note - The Details are as per year 2021-22 *

Students activities

School magazine 
Every year school comes out with magazine called as 'Pratibimb'.

Cultural activities
Students every year take part in cultural activities to show their talent like Dance and Music

Sports activities
Every year the school team participates in various inter-school sports held in Mumbai.

School Picnics 
Every year a school picnic is organised to an amusement park.

Scout Guide Camps 
Every year a scout guide camp is arranged for students of STD 9th .

Students council
Students council is formed in order to work in partnership with the school management, staff and parents for the benefit of the school. The members are elected by voting method.

Basic Details Of School (2021-22)

References

External links
 

Schools in Mumbai